Juventud Comunista ('Communist Youth') was a weekly newspaper published from Barcelona, Spain 1936-1937. It was the central organ of the Iberian Communist Youth (JCI), the youth wing of POUM. The first issue was published on 17 September 1936. It was printed in large format, with four pages. The newspaper carried photos and caricatures. Juventud Comunista had a circulation of 15,000.

References

1936 establishments in Spain
1937 disestablishments in Spain
Communist_newspapers_published_in_Spain
Defunct newspapers published in Spain
Defunct weekly newspapers
Marxist newspapers
Newspapers published in Barcelona
Publications established in 1936
Publications disestablished in 1937
Spanish-language newspapers
POUM
Weekly newspapers published in Spain